Ministry of Interior in the Republic of Crimea (Russian: МВД по Республике Крым; Ukrainian: Міністерство внутрішніх справ по Республіці Крим; Crimean Tatar: Qırım içki işler nazirligi) is de facto the main police authority in Crimea in the Southern Federal District that was established by Russia after the 2014 Russian annexation of Crimea. Crimea is recognized as part of Ukraine by most of the international community.

The current minister is Sergey Abisov (Since March 1, 2014). The Ministry's Headquarters is located in Simferopol, 4 Khmelnisky B. street.

Main functions
 Ensuring of protection of the human rights and freedom;
 Organization of prevention, reveal, suppression and investigation of crime, prevention and suppression of administrative delinquency
 Ensuring of public order protection in Crimea
 Ensuring of road safety in Crimea
 Organization and control for turnover of civil and staff weapon, explosives in Crimea
 Organization and control for non-governmental (private) security and detective work in Crimea
 Organization of property protection of physical and juridical parties by the agreements
 Management of subordinate interior bodies, subdivisions and organizations
 Operation of the Berkut (special police force)

History
The first independent law enforcement body in Crimea was formed on April 9, 1921 with the establishment of The Extraordinary Commission  of Crimean Oblast (Крымская областная Чрезвычайная комиссия) by decree No. 332 of the Revolutionary Committee of Crimea.

After the formation of Soviet Militsiya, the commission was called as Crimean Militsiya (Крыммилиция) and officially began to be named as Main Republic's Militsiya. Om March 4, 1922 the Extraordinary Commission  of Crimean Oblast (local Cheka) was renamed as Crimean Political Directorate (Крымское Политуправление) with 390 officers.

In 1922 all the policing bodies in Crimea became part of the NKVD of Crimean Autonomous Soviet Socialist Republic (Управление НКВД СССР по Крымской АССР).

In March 1946 (as part of the governmental reforms) the NKVD was renamed to Ministry for Internal Affairs (УМВД Крымской области). In November 1962 the Ministry was renamed as Directorate for Public Order (Управление охраны общественного порядка, УООП Крыма) and shortly after it became Directorate for Internal Affairs under the Executive Committee of Crimea (Управление внутренних дел Крымоблисполкома).

After the dissolution of the Soviet Union, the Crimean Interior Ministry re-organized in May 1994 as Crimea's Main Directorate for Internal Affairs of Autonomous Republic of Crimea (ГУМВД Украины в АР Крым).

In March 2014 the Main Directorate has become the Ministry for Internal Affairs of the Republic of Crimea and was re-organized as part of Russian Policing system.

Heads of Police and Ministers

Chief of Police
 Ludwig Tsyntsar (November 1921 – January 1924)
 Yan Laubets (1924)
 Tishe Lordkipanidze (1935–1937)
 N. Smirnov (1942)

Ministers

See also
Sevastopol City Police

Notes

References

External links
Official Website (Russian)
RoadSafety Department // Official Website (Russian)
Old Website
Old Ukrainian Website

Politics of Crimea
Crimea